Ku-ring-gai is an electoral district of the Legislative Assembly in the Australian state of New South Wales. Since 2015 it has been represented by Alister Henskens of the Liberal Party. The electorate covers the suburbs and parts of the suburbs of Gordon, Hornsby, Killara, Lindfield, Normanhurst, North Turramurra, North Wahroonga, Pymble, South Turramurra, Thornleigh, Turramurra, Wahroonga, Waitara, Warrawee and West Pymble.

History
Ku-ring-gai was created before the 1973 election and was held by John Maddison, a minister in the government of Askin, who had previously been the member for Hornsby. Maddison retired in 1980 and future Premiers of New South Wales Nick Greiner won the seat at a by-election. He held the seat until resigning from Parliament and as Premier in 1992 in the aftermath of the ICAC enquiry into the Metherell affair. He was succeeded by Stephen O'Doherty, who in 1999 chose to follow the majority of his constituents into the re-created seat of Hornsby. Barry O'Farrell transferred to Ku-ring-gai in 1999 after his seat of Northcott was abolished, and held it when he became Premier after leading the Coalition to a massive landslide victory in the 2011 state election. He resigned as premier in 2014 and retired from politics after the 2015 state election, handing the seat to current member Henskens.

Located in the  heartland of the North Shore, Ku-ring-gai has been in Liberal hands for its entire existence, and for much of that time has been an ultra-safe seat even by North Shore standards. The Liberals have never tallied less than 65 percent of the two-party vote, and have always taken the seat on the first count with no need for preferences. At the 2011 election, for instance, O'Farrell was reelected with 81.3% of the two-candidate-preferred vote, making Ku-ring-gai the safest seat in the entire NSW parliament.

While  frequently runs dead in north Sydney, Ku-ring-gai is particularly hostile territory for Labor. Since the 1990s, Labor has usually been lucky to get 20 percent of the primary vote. In 2011, for example, Labor was pushed into third place behind the Greens. The seat is almost entirely within the equally safe federal seat of Bradfield, previously one of the safest federal Liberal seats in the country, prior to the 2022 election where it became marginal.

Ku-ring-gai is one of four current electorates in the New South Wales Legislative Assembly to have been held by two Premiers of New South Wales while in office. Both Premiers Greiner and O'Farrell held Ku-ring-gai while in office. The other three electorates being Maroubra, Willoughby and Wollondilly.

As a result of a redistribution in 2021, Ku-ring-gai will be abolished at the 2023 election and largely replaced by Wahroonga.

Members for Ku-ring-gai

Election results

References

Ku-ring-gai
1973 establishments in Australia
Constituencies established in 1973